Byssoporia is a fungal genus in the family Albatrellaceae. The genus is monotypic, containing the single widespread corticioid species Byssoporia terrestris. There are several varieties: sartoryi, lilacinorosea, aurantiaca, sublutea, and parksii. These differ in bruising reaction, presence of clamp connections in the hyphae, or hyphal morphology. It was previously thought to belong in the Atheliaceae, but a molecular phylogenetics found it to belong in the Albatrellaceae.

References

External links

Russulales
Russulales genera